San-in Chūō Television Broadcasting Co., Ltd. (TSK, 山陰中央テレビジョン放送株式会社), formerly Shimane Broadcasting (島根放送株式会社), is a TV station of Fuji News Network (FNN) and Fuji Network System (FNS) that broadcasts in Shimane Prefecture and Tottori Prefecture.

The head office
721, Nishi-Kawatsucho, Matsue, Shimane Prefecture, Japan

channel

Analog
 Matsue JOMI-TV 34Ch
 Tottori 24Ch
 Kurayoshi 58Ch
 Hamada 58Ch
 Oda 57Ch
 Masuda 42Ch
 Gotsu 42Ch
 Okinoshima 47Ch
 Kisuki Mitoya (un'nan city) 57Ch
 Misumi 44Ch etc...

Digital
Matsue JOMI-DTV 43Ch
Tottori 36Ch

Programs
TSK Super News
Go! Go!  Gulliver-kun (Go! Go!ガリバーくん, end)
Super Sentai Series (produced by TV Asahi)

External links
Official website of San-in Chūō TV (Japanese)

Fuji News Network
Television stations in Japan
Television channels and stations established in 1970
Mass media in Matsue, Shimane